Shadnagar Assembly constituency is a constituency of Telangana Legislative Assembly, India. It is one of 14 constituencies in KV Ranga Reddy district. It is part of Mahbubnagar Lok Sabha constituency.

Anjaiah Yadav of Telangana Rashtra Samithi won the seat in 2014 and 2018 Assembly Elections.

Mandals
The Assembly Constituency presently comprises the following Mandals:

Members of Legislative Assembly

Election results

Telangana Legislative Assembly election, 2014

Telangana Legislative Assembly election, 2018

See also
 List of constituencies of Telangana Legislative Assembly
|party=Bahujan Samaj Party |candidate=K Shankar|votes=|party=Bahujan Samaj Party |candidate=K Shankar|votes=72,315|percentage=16.7072,315|percentage=16.70

References

See also
 List of constituencies of Telangana Legislative Assembly

Assembly constituencies of Telangana
Mahbubnagar district